Adorjás is a village in Baranya county, Sellye District, Hungary.

External links 
 Local statistics 

Populated places in Baranya County